Belle Starr's Daughter is a 1948 American Western film directed by Lesley Selander and starring George Montgomery, Rod Cameron and Ruth Roman.

Plot

After the town marshal of Antioch is shot by Bob Yauntis, the newly appointed Tom Jackson sets out to apprehend the killer. But when he and his posse get to the ranch of bandit queen Belle Starr, they discover her dead body and the house on fire. Seeing this from a distance, Belle's daughter Rose mistakenly concludes Marshal Jackson killed her mother.

Rose works as a waitress and Jackson attempts to romance her, but she is cold to his advances. Rose begins pulling off robberies along with Bob, who shoots the ranch's foreman, Lafe Bailey and attempts to avoid detection as a ruthless outlaw called "Bitter Creek" who is being sought by lawmen.

Bob eventually turns his wrath on Rose, striking her and holding her captive. Rose escapes and turns to Jackson, who is in love with her. After being taken into custody, Bob is able to wing Jackson with a concealed weapon, whereupon Jackson shoots him dead.

Cast
 George Montgomery as Marshal Tom Jackson
 Rod Cameron as Bob 'Bitter Creek' Yauntis
 Ruth Roman as Cimarron Rose
 Wallace Ford as Lafe Bailey
 Charles Kemper as Deputy Gaffer
 William Edward Phipps as Yuma Talbott
 Edith King as Mrs. Allen
 Jack Lambert as Bronc Wilson
 Fred Libby as Slim Smith
 Isabel Jewell as Belle Starr
 J. Farrell MacDonald as Doc Benson
 Chris-Pin Martin as Spanish George (as Cris-Pin Martin)
 Larry Johns as Marshal Jed Purdy
 Kenneth MacDonald as Uncle Jim Davis
 Christine Larson as Marie (as Christine Larsen 
 Charles Stevens as Cherokee Joe
 William Perrott as Marshal Jed Loftus
 Mary Foran as Bonnie
 Frank Darien as Old Man
 Paul E. Burns as Clearwater Doctor
 Alvin Hammer as Townsman
 Lane Chandler as Marshal Evans

See also
 Belle Starr (film) - 1941 American Western film
 List of American films of 1948

References

External links
 
 
 

1948 films
1940s English-language films
20th Century Fox films
American Western (genre) films
1948 Western (genre) films
Films directed by Lesley Selander
American black-and-white films
1940s American films